Slavery existed in the Trucial States (1892-1971), which later formed the United Arab Emirates. The region was mainly supplied with enslaved people from the Indian Ocean slave trade, but humans were also trafficked to the area from Hejaz, Oman and Persia. Slaves were used in the famous pearl fish industry as well as sex slaves and domestic servants. Slavery was abolished in the Trucial States in 1970.

History

In the 1890s, the British Empire gained control over the area. They established the Trucial States in 1892. The British power over these states were managed via the India Office and their foreign policy and contact with the outside world through the Foreign Office. However, the British did not interfere with the inner policy of the Trucial States, but was content with keeping peace with the indigenous power holders, protecting British citizens, and managing the contacts between the Trucial States and the international community, in which they assured that the Trucial States obeyed the same international treaties signed by the British themselves. The British met a substantial slave trade in the area with old historic roots.

Slave trade
During the Omani Empire (1692-1856), Oman was a center of the Zanzibar slave trade. Slaves were trafficked from the Swahili coast of East Africa via Zanzibar to Oman. From Oman, the slaves were exported to the rest of the Arabian Peninsula and Persia, including the Trucial States, Qatar, Bahrain and Kuwait. The Omani slave trade from Africa started to shrink in the late 19th-century, but a second slave trade from Africa via Hejaz continued.

A second route of slave trade existed, with people from both Africa and East Asia, who were smuggled to Jeddah in the Arabian Peninsula in connection to the Muslim pilgrimage, Hajj, to Mecca and Medina. These slaves were imported from the Hejaz to Oman, the Trucial States, Qatar, Bahrain and Kuwait. Victims were tricked to perform the journey willingly in the belief that they were going on the Hajj pilgrimage or employed as servants and then sold upon arrival. The method of kidnapping was also used.

In the 1940s, a third slave trade route was noted, in which Balochis from Balochistan were shipped across the Persian Gulf, many of whom had sold themselves or their children to escape poverty.

The vast majority of slaves were of African origin, but there were also a minority from Asia and Europe.

Function

Female slaves were used as domestic servants and as concubines (sex slaves), while male slaves were primarily used within the pearl industry as pearl divers. In the 1950s, a high percentage of oil workers in Abu Dhabi were slaves.  The British Foreign Office repeatedly and unsuccessfully asked the Iraq Petroleum Company not to employ slaves, but was met with the reply that it was the responsibility of the shaykhs to supply the workers.

In 1943, it was reported that Baloch girls were shipped via Oman and the Trucial States to Mecca, where they were popular as concubines, since Caucasian (Circassian) girls were no longer available, and were sold for $350–450.

Slaves were given a new name on arrival, and gradually integrated in to the local culture, gradually forgetting their past; freed slaves normally by culture stayed in the household or in a clientship of their former owners.

Activism against slave trade

The British Empire, having signed the 1926 Slavery Convention, was obliged to fight slavery and the slave trade in all land under the direct or indirect control of the British Empire. Since the Trucial States were formally under British control, the British were expected to enforce this policy in the region. Officially, the British declared that they did just that, but in reality, the slavery and slave trade in the Trucial States were tolerated by the British.

As was the case with the rest of the Gulf states, the British considered their control over the region insufficient to do something about the slavery and the slave trade. The British policy was therefore to assure the League of Nations that the region followed the same anti slavery treaties signed by the British, but in parallel prevent any international observations of the area, which would disprove these claims.

In both 1932 and 1935, the British colonial authorities refused to interfere in the slavery of the Trucial States, Qatar, Bahrain and Kuwait, since they were afraid that they could lose control over the area if they should attempt to enforce a policy against slavery, and they therefore prevented all international observation of the area which could force them to take action.

As late as 1935, the British authorities thus assured the League of Nations that the Trucial States, Qatar, Bahrain and Kuwait had banned all slave trading in the region in treaties with the British, while at the same time, the British refused any international inspections in the region which would have revealed that a substantial slave trade was in fact going on, especially within the pearl fishing industry, where the slaves were particularly harshly treated.

In 1936, the British finally acknowledged to the League of Nations that there was still ongoing slavery and a slave trade in the Trucial States, Oman and Qatar, but claimed that it was limited, and that all slaves who sought asylum at the British Agents Office in Sharjah were granted manumission.  In reality, the British reports were deliberately playing down the size of the actual substantional slave trade going on in the region.  In the 1940s, there were several suggestions made by the British to combat the slave trade and the slavery in the region, but none was considered enforceable.

Abolition

After World War II, there was a growing international pressure from the United Nations to end the slave trade. After the Independence of India in 1947, the 
British Foreign Office secured direct control over the Trucial States and for the first time considered itself to have sufficient control to enforce the laws against slavery and slave trade, particularly since a bigger international presence in the Gulf States attracted more attention to the slavery, and a stronger international condemnation against it.

In 1948, the United Nations declared slavery to be a crime against humanity in the Universal Declaration of Human Rights, after which the Anti-Slavery Society pointed out that there were about one million slaves in the Arabian Peninsula, which was a crime against the 1926 Slavery Convention, and demanded that the UN form a committee to handle the issue.

Slavery was abolished in all of the Trucial States in 1970. In 1971, the former Trucial States founded the United Arab Emirates where poor migrant workers were employed under the Kafala system which has been compared to slavery.

See also

 Human rights in Oman#Domestic workers
 History of slavery in the Muslim world
 History of concubinage in the Muslim world
 Slavery in Saudi Arabia
 Human trafficking in the Middle East
 Kafala system

References

 Joel Quirk: The Anti-Slavery Project: From the Slave Trade to Human Trafficking
 Jerzy Zdanowski:  Speaking With Their Own Voices: The Stories of Slaves in the Persian Gulf
 C.W.W. Greenidge:  Slavery
 William Clarence-Smith: Islam and the Abolition of Slavery

Oman
trucial
Islam and slavery
Trucial States
Slavery in Oman